Tonon is a surname. Notable people with this surname include:

 Amelia Tonon (1899―1961) was an Italian entomologist who researched silkworms
 Brigitte Affidehome Tonon , Beninois researcher, author, basketball coach and former player 
 Carlo Tonon (1955―1996), Italian professional road bicycle racer
 Garry Tonon (born 1991), American Brazilian Jiu-Jitsu practitioner
 Pedro Tonon Geromel (born 1985), Brazilian professional football central defender

See also 
 Toni